Lexington Public Schools is a public school district in Lexington, Massachusetts, United States. The district comprises six elementary schools, two middle schools, and a high school. Each elementary and middle school is named after an important figure in Lexington's history.

District schools
There are nine schools in the Lexington Public School district:
 Bowman Elementary School
 Bridge Elementary School
 Joseph Estabrook Elementary School
 Fiske Elementary School
 Harrington Elementary School
 Maria Hastings Elementary School
 Jonas Clarke Middle School
 William Diamond Middle School
 Lexington High School

Elementary schools
Lexington's six elementary schools - Bowman, Bridge, Joseph Estabrook, Fiske, Harrington, and Maria Hastings - serve students in kindergarten through 5th grade.

Bowman Elementary School
Bowman Elementary is named for the descendants of Nathaniel Bowman, the progenitor of an important family in Lexington's history. The current principal at Bowman is Jenny Corduck.  The mascot of the school is the Bowman Bear.

Bridge Elementary School
Bridge Elementary is named for the descendants of Matthew Bridge, to whom the once-farmland around the school site formerly belonged. A mural on the front side of the school building represents "working together". The current principal at Bridge is Meg Colella.

Bridge was a High Performing National Blue Ribbon School in 2010.

Joseph Estabrook Elementary School
Estabrook Elementary is named after Joseph Estabrook (1669–1733), the first school teacher in Lexington. The current principal at Estabrook is Gerardo Martinez.

The school garnered nationwide attention from the David Parker controversy, when parents sued the Lexington school system, arguing that their children were being coerced by public school teachers "to affirm the correctness and the normalcy of homosexuality" and same-sex marriage. The bulk of the legality of the controversy revolved around whether parents have a right to receive parental notification and opt their elementary school children out of such content.  Federal courts ruled against the Parkers.

The school was torn down and rebuilt in time for the 2014-15 school year due to PCB contamination. This was the first time in the United States that a school was torn down for that reason.

Fiske Elementary School
Fiske Elementary is named for the Fiske family, which circa 1678 was the first family to settle on East Street. The current principal at Fiske is Brian Baker. The current facility was constructed between 2005 and 2007.

A Fiske that was formerly located on Maple Street adjacent to Harrington Elementary School closed in February 2007, reopening as an office building, Lexington Public Schools Administrative Offices, in 2008.

Harrington Elementary School
Harrington Elementary is named for the Harrington family, which produced many notable town citizens, such as Jonathan Harrington who was killed in the Battle of Lexington, and another of the same name who was the battle's last survivor. The current principal at Harrington is Jackie Daley.

Maria Hastings Elementary School
Maria Hastings Elementary is named after Maria Hastings Cary, a local philanthropist and the founder of the town's main public library, Cary Library. The current principal at Hastings is Chris Wai.

The school was rebuilt from 2018-2020 due to a need for increased capacity.

Middle schools

Lexington's two public middle schools - William Diamond MS and Jonas Clarke MS, commonly referred to as "Diamond" and "Clarke," respectively - serve students between 6th and 8th grade. Students at Diamond are generally fed in through Estabrook, Fiske, and Hastings, and students at Clarke are generally fed in through Bowman, Bridge, and Harrington.

Like many middle schools, both Diamond and Clarke operate in an academic team system, in which each grade is broken down into smaller groups of common teachers and students. Each of the grades in both schools are divided into three teams, with one exception. Diamond and Clarke have built a cross-town rivalry bridging academics and athletics.

Academics

Both Diamond and Clarke have been among the top schools in MCAS testing.

Academically, both schools offer a comparable curriculum comprising several core subjects in addition to a wide range of electives. Students are required to take courses in math, science, English, and social studies, each of which follows its own track.

In math, students are required to take courses ranging up to algebra, with placement and level being determined individually. In science, students are required to take courses in earth science, life science, and chemistry and physics.

In social studies, students are required to take courses focusing on ancient civilizations, world geography, and U.S. history in 6th, 7th and 8th grades respectively. In foreign languages, students have the option to take a sequence of courses in French, Spanish, or Mandarin Chinese. The Mandarin Language program is ranked one of the best Mandarin Language programs in the country, and the school and Mandarin teachers have received many awards, such as the Confucius Institute Award and various cash and technological prizes from the Chinese Government. Top students in Spanish have the opportunity to visit Costa Rica, or in past and recent years, Spain, as part of a language and culture immersion trip abroad. Similarly, top students in French have the opportunity to visit Quebec City, and top students in Mandarin have the opportunity to visit Beijing, Jinhua, and Shanghai, China.

Students in both schools have the additional opportunity to participate in their respective school's orchestra, band, or chorus.

Sports

Both schools field varsity teams in many sports, including cross-country running, soccer, basketball, track, field hockey, baseball, and softball.

Extracurricular activities

Led by coaches Sarah Doonan at Diamond and Joshua Frost and Jeffrey Woodcock at Clarke, Lexington's middle school math teams are renowned for their successes and mutual rivalry in competitions such as MathCounts, the NEML, the American Mathematics Competitions (AMC), and in the Intermediate Math League of Eastern Massachusetts (IMLEM). Clarke's current run of seven consecutive IMLEM championships was immediately preceded by nine consecutive championships by Diamond. Two Lexington natives have won the Mathcounts national championship: Jonathan L. Weinstein in 1991 and Alec Sun in 2013. William Diamond Middle School has also won many second and third place titles at the Science Olympiads over the past few years.

Both schools have a plethora of other clubs and teams.

William Diamond Middle School
The school is named after William Diamond, the 16-year-old drummer for the Lexington Minutemen during the Battle of Lexington and Concord. The current principal at Diamond is Marlon Davis, and the assistant principals are Bayard Klimasmith and Elizabeth Sharp.

The current names of the 6th grade teams are Innovator, Pathfinder, Adventurer, and Discoverer. The 7th Grade Teams are named Determination, Fortitude, Resilience, and Tenacity. the 8th grade teams are named Alliance, Fusion, Harmony, and Unity.

Along with many other extra-curricular activities, Diamond has a school newspaper, called the "Diamond Dispatch", which is run by the students and a 6th grade English teacher. In addition, a fall play and musical are staged every year in the fall and winter respectively. Both productions are collaborated upon by the drama and technical departments, with the addition of the chorus department for the musical. Students have the option of auditioning for the cast or applying for the stage crew. Although Diamond does not have a formal student-run government, the Student Council determines spirit days, fundraisers, and other matters. 

Many of the 7th and 8th grade French and Spanish classes compete in the National French Exam and National Spanish Exam, respectively.

Jonas Clarke Middle School
The school is named after the local pastor Jonas Clarke, who was present at the standoff at Lexington Green shortly before the shots that started the Revolutionary War. The current principal at Clarke is Dane Despres, and the assistant principals are Mary Barry-Ng and Jonathan Wettstone. The school mascot is Jonas Bark the Bulldog.

Jonas Clarke Middle School has been rated one of the top schools in the United States, and received the High-Performing National Blue Ribbon Award in 2013.

The 6th grade teams are named Columbia, Atlantis, Quest, and Voyager; the 7th grade teams are named Enterprise (legacy), Endeavor, Adventurer, and Explorer; and the 8th grade teams are named Apollo, Artemis, Discovery, and Curiosity.

The S.G.A. (student government association) is the student-run government of Clarke.

Clarke also has a school newspaper, called the "Clarke Barker", which is also run by the students and a 6th grade English teacher. Clarke's other extra-curricular vary in type, however most activities are either academic, artistic or athletic. New activities are created each year by the request of the students, if there is a faculty or parent coordinator.

Lexington High School

Most students that go through the Lexington Public Schools system end up at Lexington High School. Alternatively, students are given the opportunity to attend the regional vocational school, Minuteman Regional High School, and a few each year decide to take the opportunity. Additionally, some students that go through the Lexington Public Schools system prefer to attend regional private schools.

The current principal at Lexington High School is Andrew Stephens, and the assistant principal is Andrew Baker. There are five deans: Scott Kmack, Nicole Canniff, Habiba Davis, Crystal Hunter, and Kate Herman.

Notes and references

External links
Lexington Public Schools
LPS redistricting proposal (Archive)
Redistricting map (Archive)

Lexington, Massachusetts
School districts in Massachusetts
Education in Middlesex County, Massachusetts